The 2021–22 season was FC Midtjylland's 23rd season of existence, and their 21st consecutive season in the Danish Superliga, the top tier of football in Denmark. As a result of the club's runner-up finish in 2020–21, it competed in the 2021–22 UEFA Champions League, and subsequently in the 2021–22 UEFA Europa League and the 2021-22 UEFA Europa Conference League. The Black Wolves completed a successful 2021–22 campaign with a second-place finish in the Superliga, again qualifying for the Champions League, and also captured its second Danish Cup, after defeating OB in the final on penalties.

Squad

Out on loan

Non-competitive

Pre-season friendlies

Mid-season friendlies

Atlantic Cup

Competitive

Competition record

Danish Superliga

Regular season

Results by round – Regular season

Championship round

Results by round – Championship round

Regular season

Championship round

Danish Cup

UEFA Champions League

UEFA Europa League

Group F

UEFA Europa Conference League

Statistics

Appearances 

Includes all competitive matches.

Goalscorers 

This includes all competitive matches.

Assists 
This includes all competitive matches.

Clean sheets 

This includes all competitive matches.

Disciplinary record 

This includes all competitive matches.

References

External links 
 FC Midtjylland  in Danish

FC Midtjylland seasons
Danish football clubs 2021–22 season
Midtjylland